Brent Frohoff (born May 10, 1963, in Hermosa Beach, California) is a retired American professional beach volleyball player.  Between 1983 and 2009, Frohoff played in 317 professional tournaments (4th all-time), of which he won 19 (20th all-time).

References

External links
 

1963 births
Living people
American men's beach volleyball players